Brič is a small settlement in the City Municipality of Koper in the Littoral region of Slovenia. It lies on the left bank of the Dragonja River and no longer has any permanent residents.

References

External links
Brič on Geopedia

Populated places in the City Municipality of Koper